West of the Pecos may refer to:

 Trans-Pecos, the area of West Texas that is west of the Pecos River
 West of the Pecos Museum, Pecos, Texas
 West of the Pecos Rodeo, Pecos, Texas, claimant for first rodeo

Arts and entertainment
 West of the Pecos (1922 film), a silent Western film written, directed, and starring Neal Hart as hero Jack Laramie
 West of the Pecos, a 1937 novel by Zane Grey with hero Pecos Smith, first published as a serial beginning in 1931 in The American Magazine
 West of the Pecos (1934 film), a Western film adaptation starring Richard Dix
 West of the Pecos (1945 film), a Western film adaptation starring Robert Mitchum
 West of the Pecos, a 1971 play about Roy Bean by Tim Kelly
 West of Pecos, a book of the "Sundown Riders" series by Ralph Compton

See also
 Judge Roy Bean Jr. (1825–1903), self-described as "The Only Law West of the Pecos"
 West of Hot Dog, Stan Laurel 1924 movie spoof of the 1922 film West of the Pecos
 West of the Pesos, 1960 cartoon
 The Village Horse Doctor West of the Pecos,  1971 book by Ben K. Green
 Loven vest for Pecos (The Law West of Pecos), 1981 book of essays by Norwegian author Kjartan Fløgstad
 Purgatory (1999 film), also known as Purgatory West of the Pecos